Miroslav Fiedler (7 April 1926 – 20 November 2015) was a Czech mathematician known for his contributions to linear algebra, graph theory and algebraic graph theory.

His article, "Algebraic Connectivity of Graphs", published in the Czechoslovak Math Journal in 1973, established the use of the eigenvalues of the Laplacian matrix of a graph to create tools for measuring algebraic connectivity in algebraic graph theory. Fiedler is honored by the Fiedler eigenvalue (the second smallest eigenvalue of the graph Laplacian), with its associated Fiedler eigenvector, as the names for the quantities that characterize algebraic connectivity. Since Fiedler's original contribution, this structure has become essential to large areas of research in network theory, flocking, distributed control, clustering, multi-robot applications and image segmentation.

References

External links
  Home page at the Academy of Sciences of the Czech Republic.
 

1926 births
2015 deaths
Mathematicians from Prague
Czech mathematicians
Graph theorists
Recipients of Medal of Merit (Czech Republic)
Combinatorialists
Charles University alumni